The IS-related terrorist attacks in Turkey refers to a series of attacks and clashes between Turkey and the Islamic State (IS) as part of the spillover of the Syrian Civil War. Turkey joined the international military intervention against the Islamic State in 2016, after ISIL attacks in Turkey. The Turkish Armed Forces' Operation Euphrates Shield was partly aimed at IS, and part of the Turkish occupation of northern Syria, around Jarabulus and al-Bab, was conquered from IS.

Etymology 
Turkey like some other countries, such as France and the UK uses the name DAESH or DAIS, which is the group's Arabic acronym for ISIL (Islamic State of Iraq and the Levant).

Background

Allegations of Turkish cooperation and support 

Ever since the formal founding of ISIL from its Islamist predecessor groups in June 2014, Turkey has faced numerous allegations of collaboration with and support for ISIL in international media. Several of the allegation have focused on Turkish businessman and politician Berat Albayrak, who has faced calls for his prosecution in the United States.

In June 2014, when ISIL had kidnapped 49 Turkish diplomats, Turkish opposition politicians accused the government of siding with militants such as ISIL, and a columnist said that Turkey now was "paying the price of its collaboration with terrorists".

Turkish opposition commentators and politicians in September 2014 again accused their government of implicitly supporting and funding ISIL, pointing to Turkey's decision to not allow the United States Air Force to use the highly strategic İncirlik Air Base for their military intervention against ISIL.

Some news websites in late 2014 also reported foreign criticism of Turkey's "doing nothing" against ISIL.

In April 2018 an article was published by Foreign Policy in which it was stated that in 2013 alone, some 30,000 militants traversed Turkish soil, establishing the so-called jihadi highway, as the country became a conduit for fighters seeking to join the Islamic State. Furthermore, it was claimed that wounded Islamic State militants were treated for free at hospitals across southeastern Turkey. Among those receiving care was one of the top deputies of Islamic State chieftain Abu Bakr al-Baghdadi, Ahmet el-H, who was treated in a private hospital in Sanliurfa in August 2014.

IS recruits 
American website Al-Monitor stated in June 2014 that Turkey, during the Syrian Civil War, by "ignoring its own border security", had allowed its Syrian border to become a "jihadist highway" for ISIL to let thousands of international jihadists, and other supplies, reach Syria. British newspaper The Guardian stated that Turkey, in late year 2014, "for many months did little to stop foreign recruits crossing its border to Isis".

A joint communiqué, issued 11 September 2014 by the United States and 10 Arab states, to stop the flow of volunteers to ISIL was not signed by Turkey present at the meeting. This not-signing may have been caused by the fact that ISIL then was holding 49 Turks hostage (see section June 2014: ISIL designated terrorists, then kidnap 49 Turks).

IS offensive on Kobanî
On 29 November 2014, reports emerged of ISIL fighters allegedly launching an assault on Kobanî from Turkish territory. Kurdish sources in Kobane said that ISIL fighters attacked Kobane from Turkish territory, and that the assault began with a vehicle driven by a suicide bomber coming from Turkish territory. During the attack, a group of ISIL fighters were seen atop granary silos on the Turkish side of the border. According to the German news outlet Der Spiegel, ISIL fighters also attacked YPG positions near the border gate from Turkish soil. According to the SOHR, YPG fighters crossed the Turkish border and attacked ISIL positions on Turkish soil, before pulling back to Syria. Soon afterwards, the Turkish Army regained control of the border crossing and silos area. The Turkish government rejected all those claims.

Turkish Prime Minister Ahmet Davutoglu later claimed that "Turkey is the first country which designated ISIS as a terrorist organization and refuted the allegations which claimed Turkey had involvement in the Kobane attacks." However this claim was disputed, Sezgin Tanrıkulu, a Human Rights lawyer stated "When one investigates all of the editions of the official gazette of the Turkish government in October of 2013, one sees that ISIS was never declared as a terror organization.". Request for confirmation on whether the police define ISIS as terrorists, this information request was not provided.

Chronology

2013 Turkey–IS conflict

May 11: Potential IS attack 

On 11 May 2013, two car bombs exploded in the town of Reyhanlı, Hatay Province, Turkey, close to the busiest land border post (Bab al-Hawa Border Crossing) with Syria. 51 people were killed and 140 injured in the attack, the deadliest single act of terrorism to occur on Turkish soil up until then—to be surpassed by the 10 October 2015 Ankara bombings with 102 deaths.

The responsibility for the attack is as yet unclear: politicians, authorities, media, suspects have named at least six possibilities. Islamic State of Iraq and the Levant (ISIL) as late as September 2013, at the occasion of a threat to the Turkish government, suddenly claimed the 11 May 2013 attack. In response to the attacks, the Turkish government sent air and ground forces to increase the already heavy military presence in the area.

September 30: IS threatens Turkey with attacks 
Around 30 September 2013, according to English-language newspaper/website Today's Zaman, "a statement attributed to (…) ISIL" threatened Turkey with a series of suicide attacks in Istanbul and Ankara unless Turkey would reopen its Syrian border crossings at Bab al-Hawa and Bab al-Salameh before 7 October.

2014 Turkey–IS conflict

January 28: Turkish attack on IS convoy 

On 28 January 2014, the Turkish air force, according to few sources, performed an airstrike on Syrian territory hitting a pickup, a truck and a bus in an IS convoy, killing 11 ISIL fighters and ISIL emir Abu Ja'fr Dagestani. Conflicting reports however said it was fire from Turkish tanks and artillery hitting the ISIL vehicles, after mortar shells had accidentally landed in Turkey.

March 20: Potential IS attack on Turkish security officials
On 20 March, three foreigners emerging from a taxi opened fire with an AK-47 (some reports say Glock automatics) and lobbed a hand grenade, killing a soldier and a policeman who were conducting routine checks on the Ulukisla–Adana expressway, and injuring four soldiers. The attackers were wounded in return fire but got away. Two of the attackers were apprehended at Eminlik village, where villagers, thinking they were wounded Syrians, took them to the local medical clinic. Kosovan officials confirmed that the attackers were linked to al-Qaeda; some Turkish media preferred the scenario that they were from ISIL.

June 11: IS kidnaps 49 Turks
In June 2014, Turkey blacklisted ISIL and al-Nusra Front as terrorist organizations.

On 11 June 2014, IS captured the Turkish consulate and held its 49 people staff as hostages. This happened during the June 2014 takeover of Mosul (Iraq).

The hostages were freed in mid-September 2014. It was later revealed that Turkish authorities had first paid an amount of money to ISIL officials and later swapped the hostages for 180 ISIL militants who had been apprehended or undergoing medical treatment in Turkey. Turkey earlier had denied paying ransom.

September 5: Turkey enters US-led coalition against IS 

On 5 September 2014, Turkey entered a US-led coalition of ten countries vowing to 'join forces to fight ISIL'.

November 22: Turkish Training of Kurdish Peshmerga 
Early November 2014, Turkish soldiers began training Kurdish Peshmerga fighters in northern Iraq, Turkey and Peshmerga confirmed, 'as part of the struggle against ISIL', a Turkish official said.

2015 Turkey–IS conflict

January 6: Istanbul attack 
On 6 January 2015, a bomb is detonated in Istanbul's Sultanahmet Square. One police officer got killed while another officer was injured.

March 6: ISIL threatens the Turkish Suleyman Shah Tomb 

After Islamic State of Iraq and the Levant (ISIL) in March 2014 had threatened to attack the Tomb of Suleyman Shah (the grandfather of Osman I, the founder of the Ottoman Empire; the tomb was located in northern Syria), and in early 2015 possibly was surrounding that tomb site, Turkey on 21 February 2015 decided to evacuate that tomb site, with a military convoy of hundred armored vehicles and 570 troops, and remove it, some 27 km northward, still in Syria but now 200 meters from the Turkish border.

June 5: Diyarbakır attack 

On 5 June 2015, just 48 hours before the June 2015 general election, two separate bombs exploded at an electoral rally in Diyarbakır held by the pro-Kurdish Peoples' Democratic Party (HDP). Four were killed and dozens were injured. Suspicions as for the perpetrators lie on ISIL, and on some ISIL-linked terrorist cell named the 'Dokumacılar' (Weavers).

July 20: Bomb attack Suruç 

On 20 July 2015, the municipal cultural center in Suruç in the southeastern province of Şanlıurfa was bombed. 34 people, mostly university-aged students planning to reconstruct the Syrian border town of Kobanî, were killed and more than 100 people were injured. ISIL claimed the attack a couple of days later. According to journalist Serkan Demirtas, this attack could be considered as a declaration of war by ISIL on Turkey.

July 23: Turkish air bases for US to use against IS 

On 22 or 23 July, the U.S. reached an agreement with Turkey for American warplanes striking ISIL in Syria to use the Turkish air bases at İncirlik in Yüreğir, Adana Province and Diyarbakır in Diyarbakır Province, both in southern Turkey. Turkey confirmed the deal on 24 July. US Gen. Joseph L. Votel, head of the Pentagon's Special Operations Command, on 24 July thanked Turkey for its permission to use the Turkish air bases: "It provides additional flexibility and agility in addressing this enemy ISIL (…) It also means that Turkey has taken another step forward in being more committed to helping us."

July 23: Elbeyli incident 
On 23 July 2015 at 13:30 local time, five gunmen identified by the Turkish military as ISIL fighters attacked a Turkish border outpost in the border town of Elbeyli, Kilis Province, killing one Turkish soldier (Yalçın Nane) and wounding five.

In reaction, Turkish forces pursued the militants into Syria, and Turkish tanks and artillery shelled ISIL militants in northern Syria, killing at least one militant and obliterating a number of ISIL vehicles.

Turkish tanks also bombarded a small (abandoned) Syrian village north of Azaz, Aleppo, in which the ISIL militants were thought to be taking refuge, and killed or wounded several of the ISIL militants who were trying to take cover there.

Around 7pm on 23 July, reports stated that 100 ISIL militants had been killed, but those reports were criticised by anti-government newspapers. The Turkish Armed Forces later stated that all five ISIL militants who had attacked the Turkish army in Elbeyli had been killed.

July 24: 'Turkish–American zone in northern Syria'

On 24 July 2015, the Turkish, English-language newspaper/website Hürriyet Daily News, referring to unnamed "Turkish sources", reported that the deal, made public by the United States the previous day, in which Turkey gave permission to the US to use Turkish air bases for their air strikes on ISIL, was coupled to the consent the US gave to Turkey to set up a "partial no-fly zone" in Northern Syria of 90 km wide, between Syria's Mare' and Jarabulus (Cerablus), 40 to 50 km deep.

Neither Turkey nor the US has officially confirmed the deal on the Turkish buffer zone – a no-fly zone protected by Turkish and coalition forces – which would provide a safe haven for refugees and deny crucial territory to the Syrian Kurds. In the no-fly zone, Syrian regime jets will not be permitted, Hürriyet stated.

Hürriyet Daily News suggested on 24 July that the no-fly zone was intended to "prevent radical groups such as ISIL or the (...) al-Nusra Front from gaining the mentioned land". While no official statement was released on the supposed deal on a 'no-fly zone', the British The Guardian speculated the deal to be part of Turkey's preoccupation with "thwarting Kurdish separatist ambitions in lawless parts of Iraq and Syria" and a prelude to the US turning a blind eye to possible future Turkish military action against the Syrian Kurdish People's Protection Units (YPG) in the area.

Turkish website Hürriyet Daily News on 25 July, again referring to unspecified "sources", changed their earlier narrative and vocabulary. Their story now ran as that Turkey and the US had agreed on an "ISIL-free zone" in northern Syria, 98 kilometers long between Mare' and Jarabulus and 40 km deep, an area at that moment largely under ISIL control, from which the US and Turkey planned to totally eliminate all "jihadist terrorists" such as ISIL. That goal would be pursued by air strikes mainly by the U.S., for which the US had been given permission (on 23 July) to use the Turkish air base İncirlik; Turkey would if necessary, assist with long-range ground artillery.

Mentioned unspecified 'sources' now reportedly had stressed that the zone should not be called a 'security zone' nor a 'safe zone' nor a 'no-fly zone' because such names might give the wrong impression to the Syrian government that the Turkish-American objective in this area was to fight the Syrian Assad-government.

Mentioned unspecified 'sources' reportedly had further stated that Turkey and the US hoped that the zone, once cleared from ISIL presence, would be ruled by the Free Syrian Army, which would at the same time prevent the Syrian Kurdish Democratic Union Party (PYD) from expanding their influence in the region and create a safe zone for Syrian refugees.

July 24: Turkish airstrikes on IS 

On 24 and 25 July, Turkey carried out three waves of airstrikes on IS targets in Syria. These attacks were motivated as an effort to pre-empt a planned attack on Turkey and to be a "safeguard [for the Turkish] national security". Considering its name 'Martyr Yalçın', it appears a revenge for an alleged ISIL attack the previous day killing a Turkish soldier named Yalçın Nane.

Two ISIL headquarters, an ISIL gathering point, and several more ISIL targets were struck, and reportedly 35 ISIL men killed; some Turkish F-16 jets thereby violated Syrian airspace.

July 25: Anti-IS police raids in Turkey 

On 25 July, Turkey engaged in police raids in 22 provinces in Turkey targeting suspected members of ISIL, the Kurdish Kurdistan Workers' Party (PKK), the Kurdish Revolutionary People's Liberation Party–Front (DHKP/C) and PKK's youth organisation YGD/H.

590 suspects from all of the groups targeted had been arrested by 25 July. The arrests included one ISIL member who had allegedly been planning a suicide bombing in Konya.

October 10: Ankara bombings 
 
The 10 October 2015 Ankara bombings cost the lives of 107 people, more than 500 were injured. The responsibility is not yet clear; the government on 12 October pointed at ISIL but refused to rule out possible involvement of PKK or leftist militants.

2016 Turkey–IS conflict

January 8: IS attacks Turkish Bashiqa camp 
Turkish forces at Iraq's Bashiq camp killed 17 ISIL militants when the group attacked the camp with rocket fire and assault rifles. This was the third attack by ISIL on the Turkish base. Turkey has been training an armed anti-ISIL Sunni group in the camp.

January 12: First 2016 Istanbul bombing and retaliation 
On January 12, 2016, an ISIL suicide bomber committed the 2016 Istanbul bombing in Istanbul's historic Sultanahmet Square, killing 12 people. All of the victims killed were foreign citizens (11 Germans, 1 Peruvian). In response to the bombing, the Turkish Army commenced tank and artillery strikes on ISIL positions in Syria and Iraq. Turkish authorities estimate that these 48 hours of shelling killed nearly 200 ISIL fighters.

March 19: Second 2016 Istanbul bombing 
On March 19, a second ISIL suicide bombing took place in Istanbul's Beyoğlu district. The attack killed four and wounded 36 people. On March 22, the Turkish interior minister said that the bomber had links with ISIL.

March 20: Postponement of the Istanbul derby 
On March 20, the Galatasaray–Fenerbahçe derby game was postponed due to a suspected ISIL plot to stage an attack similar to the attack in Paris in November last year.

ISIL fire rockets at Turkish border and Turkey's response 

On April 22, three people were killed and six others were wounded when ISIL rocket projectiles hit the border province of Kilis.

On April 24, two rockets fired from ISIL hit Kilis. 16 people were wounded, six of whom were Syrian citizens.

On April 25, the Turkish General Staff has announced that eight militants of the ISIL were killed the same day when Turkish artillery units shelled a missile launcher. Also, the same day the U.S.-led coalition hit ISIL targets in northern Syria, located directly across from the southeastern province of Kilis.

On April 26, according to the Turkish army, two missile launchers belonging to the ISIL were destroyed in an artillery strike which also killed 11 ISIL militants. This was the second such initiative by the Turkish Army in the past two days.

On April 27, according to Turkish sources, 13 ISIL militants were killed when Turkish artillery units shelled a building in the Duwaibik region to the north of Aleppo. The building used by ISIL militants collapsed, killing 13 militants inside and injuring another seven. Around 150 Katyusha rocket projectiles stored on the ground floor of the building were also destroyed. The same day Turkish artillery units also shelled two missile launchers and killed 11 ISIL militants.

On April 28, five mortar shells targeting a border military post in the Karkamış district of the southeastern province of Gaziantep were fired by the ISIL. 11 ISIL militants were killed in Turkish artillery shellings following the attack according to Turkish sources.

On April 29, two rocket projectiles fired by the ISIL hit the border province of Kilis in Turkey.

2017 Turkey–IS conflict

January 1: New Year's Eve nightclub attack 

On January 1, a gunman entered a nightclub in Istanbul and killed 39 people.

February: large-scale arrest 
On 6 February, about 820 ISIL suspects, most of them foreign nationals, were arrested in at least 29 provinces, including capital Ankara and southeastern provinces during the past week, Anadolu news agency reported.

2019 Turkey–ISIL conflict
On November 4, 2019, Turkish communications director Fahrettin Altun stated that Rasmiya Awad, Baghdadi's lesser-known older sister, had been captured. According to Reuters, citing Turkish officials, Awad was captured in a raid on a shipping container in the Turkish-controlled Syrian border town of Azaz and that Turkish authorities were interrogating her husband and daughter-in-law who were also detained. When captured, she was also accompanied by five children. "We hope to gather a trove of intelligence from Baghdadi’s sister on the inner workings of Isis," Altun stated. Little independent information is available on Baghdadi’s sister and Reuters was not immediately able to verify if the captured individual was her.

2020 Turkey–IS conflict

2021 Turkey–IS conflict

2022 Turkey–IS conflict
Turkey has claimed to have arrested a third ISIL leader Abu al-Hasan al-Hashimi al-Qurashi.

2023 Turkey–IS conflict

See also
 2015 counter-terrorism operations in Turkey
 Terrorism in Turkey

References 

 
Wars involving the Islamic State of Iraq and the Levant
Conflicts in 2013
Conflicts in 2014
Conflicts in 2015
Conflicts in 2016
Conflicts in 2017
Conflicts in 2018
2013 in Turkey
2013 in Iraq
2014 in Turkey
2014 in Iraq
2015 in Turkey
2015 in Iraq
2016 in Turkey
2016 in Iraq
2017 in Turkey
2017 in Iraq
2018 in Turkey
2018 in Iraq
Spillover of the Syrian civil war
Religion-based wars